2018 FIH Indoor Hockey World Cup players

Tobias Constantin Hauke (born 11 September 1987) is a German field hockey player who plays as a defender for Harvestehude.

In 2007, he completed his Abitur at the Gelehrtenschule des Johanneums in Hamburg. His sister, Franzisca Hauke plays also field hockey for the German national team.

International career
He was a member of the national team that won gold medals at the 2008 Summer Olympics and 2012 Summer Olympics. On 28 May 2021, he was named as the captain in the squads for the 2021 EuroHockey Championship and the 2020 Summer Olympics. He announced his retirement from international play on 9 September 2021.

References

External links
 

Hauke at the German Hockey Federation 

1987 births
Living people
German male field hockey players
Olympic field hockey players of Germany
Field hockey players at the 2008 Summer Olympics
Olympic gold medalists for Germany
Olympic bronze medalists for Germany
Field hockey players from Hamburg
Olympic medalists in field hockey
Field hockey players at the 2012 Summer Olympics
Field hockey players at the 2016 Summer Olympics
Field hockey players at the 2020 Summer Olympics
Medalists at the 2008 Summer Olympics
2010 Men's Hockey World Cup players
Medalists at the 2012 Summer Olympics
2014 Men's Hockey World Cup players
Medalists at the 2016 Summer Olympics
2018 Men's Hockey World Cup players
2018 FIH Indoor Hockey World Cup players
People educated at the Gelehrtenschule des Johanneums
Harvestehuder THC players
Rot-Weiss Köln players
21st-century German people